42 Ultimate Hits is a compilation album by American country music artist Kenny Rogers. It was released in 2004 via Capitol Nashville. The album peaked at number 6 on the Billboard Top Country Albums chart. It includes 40 previously released songs by Rogers, five of which he recorded as Kenny Rogers and the First Edition, plus two new tracks: "My World Is Over" and "We Are the Same".

The compilation was produced by Tom Becci and Jim Mazza, with various original producers on the previously released material. "My World Is Over" was produced by Keith Stegall, and "We Are the Same" by Brent Maher.

Track listing

Chart performance

Weekly charts

Year-end charts

References

2004 compilation albums
Kenny Rogers compilation albums
Capitol Records compilation albums